Australia's Sexiest Tradie is a single-camera Australian mockumentary comedy television series on 7mate, created and written by Rick Donald, who also has the lead role. It is directed by Donald and Jason Perini and produced by Catherine Mack and Donald.

Plot
Australia's Sexiest Tradie follows the story of bogan plumber Frankie Wood. When local radio station, Heat FM, runs a seven-day competition to find "Australia's Sexiest Tradie", tradesman Franky Wood will go to any length to win and make his heartless father proud. As a finalist, Frankie finally has his moment in the spotlight with a documentary crew following his every move. But as the days pass, Frankie's portrayal of his perfect life starts to show cracks.

Cast
 Rick Donald as Franky Wood
 Jason Perini as Grub
 Peter Phelps as Boss Man Wayne
 Steve Le Marquand as Terry Wood
 Pippa Grandison as Barbara Wood
 Briallen Clarke as Hammer
 Annabelle Stephenson as Summer
 Hugo Johnstone-Burt as Steve
 Catherine Mack as Rachel
 Callan Knight as Max
 Felix Williamson as Smacker
 Carla Bignasca as Bigsie
 Ella Bourne as El
 Fiona Gillman as Gilly

Episodes

References

External links
 

2016 Australian television series debuts
Australian television sitcoms
Australian mockumentary television series
Australian comedy web series
English-language television shows
7mate original programming